Lucão is a Portuguese-language nickname for Lucas and may refer to:

Lucão (volleyball) (born 1986), born Lucas Saatkamp, Brazilian volleyball player
Lucão (footballer, born 1990), born Lucas Galdino de Paiva, Brazilian football centre-back
Lucão (footballer, born 1991), born Lucas Vinicius Gonçalves Silva, Brazilian football forward
Lucão (footballer, born 1992), born Lucas Alves de Araujo, Brazilian football defender
Lucão (footballer, born 1995), born Lucas Marcos Meireles, Brazilian football forward
Lucão (footballer, born 1996), born Lucas Cavalcante Silva Afonso, Brazilian football centre-back
Lucão (footballer, born 2000), born Lucas Gabriel Ribeiro Firmo, Brazilian football forward
Lucão (footballer, born 2001), born Lucas Alexandre Galdino de Azevedo, Brazilian football goalkeeper
Lucão (footballer, born 2002), born Lucas Gabriel Da Silva Teodoro, Brazilian football defender

Lucao may refer to the following places:
Lucao, Chiayi, a rural township in Chiayi County, Taiwan
Lucao, a barangay of Dagupan, Philippines